Maria Williams may refer to:
 Maria P. Williams, credited as the first Black woman film producer
 Maria Jane Williams, Welsh musician and folklorist

See also
 Marie Williams (disambiguation)